Campos Gerais is a municipality in the south of the Brazilian state of Minas Gerais. The population was 28,842 in 2020 in a total area of 769 km². The elevation is 1,026 m. It became a municipality in 1901.

Campos Gerais is located in the IBGE statistical microregion of Varginha.  Surrounding municipalities are Alfenas, Três Pontas, Boa Esperança, Paraguaçu, Campo do Meio, Santana da Vargem and Fama. It is 295 km from Belo Horizonte and 34 km from the important coffee center of Alfenas.  The Furnas Reservoir lies to the south.

The main economic activity is coffee growing. In 2006, there were 19,500 hectares planted. There was also production of rice, potatoes, beans, and corn. There were 2,270 rural properties with an agricultural area of 60,464 hectares. More than 10,000 people worked in agriculture. In the city there were several small industries including soft drink bottling plant.

The main tourist sites are the nearby Serra do Paraíso with waterfalls, a 32-metre high statue of Christ the Redeemer, the Igreja de Nossa Senhora do Carmo, built imitating the Spanish Gothic style, Vale dos Ipês Water Park, and the Praia das Amoras, a beach located on the banks of the Furnas lake.  Campos Gerais is known nationally for its annual Festa do Peão celebration, dedicated to the Brazilian cowboy.

Campos Gerais has 29 primary schools, of which two of them are private as of 2006. There are three middle schools: two public and one private. In addition, there are two private institutes of higher learning—FACICA and ISEC, which have courses in Pharmacy, Nursing, Biology, and Pedagogy.  Enrollment was 246 students in 2005.

In the health sector, there were 12 clinics and one private hospital with 65 beds.

Municipal Human Development Index
MHDI. .750 (2000)
State ranking: 280 out of 853 municipalities
National ranking: 1,866 out of 5138 municipalities
Life expectancy: 72 
Literacy rate: 85

See also 
 List of tallest statues

References 

 City government
Campos Gerais in the Media
 IBGE

Municipalities in Minas Gerais
1901 establishments in Brazil
Populated places established in 1910